The Holden HR is an automobile that was produced by Holden in Australia from 1966 to 1968.

Introduction
The Holden HR range was released in April 1966, replacing the Holden HD series which had been in production since 1965. In addition to a revised grille, the HR featured a  reworked roofline and larger rear window (on the sedans), revised rear lights (on sedans and wagons) and changes to almost all exterior body panels.
Other changes included revised ball joint front suspension, widened track, improved interior trim and woodgrain interior finish for the Premier models. Six months after the launch of the HR, all models were given a safety upgrade with the addition of front safety belts, windscreen washers, reversing lights, padded sun visors and a shatterproof interior rearview mirror.

Model range 
The Holden HR passenger vehicle range offered four-door sedan and five-door station wagon body styles in three trim levels with the six models marketed as follows:
 Holden Standard Sedan             (HR 215)
 Holden Standard Station Sedan (HR 219)
 Holden Special Sedan               (HR 225)
 Holden Special Station Sedan   (HR 229)
 Holden Premier Sedan               (HR 235)
 Holden Premier Station Sedan   (HR 239)

The HR commercial vehicle range was offered in two-door coupe utility and two-door panel van variants, marketed as follows:
 Holden Utility         (HR 2106)
 Holden Panel Van (HR 2104)

Engines and transmissions
The two versions of the inline six cylinder Holden Red motor were carried across from the HD series, both with increased engine capacity and a higher compression ratio  (9.2:1). The 114 bhp  six was standard in all models except the Premiers.  A 126 bhp  six was standard on Premiers and optional on all other models. The 145 bhp twin carburettor "X2" version of the "186" was initially available as an option on all models. The "X2" was replaced by the 145 bhp "186S" in June 1967, the new version fitted with a single two barrel carburettor.

A lower compression (8.2:1) version of the  six was also available.

The  and  Chevrolet six-cylinder engine was fitted for the South African market. This began partway through the HR's existence, with the 194 introduced for the 1967 model year. The Premier Automatic sold in South Africa retained the Australian engine, at least until 1969. The South African Holden Special had power disc brakes in front as standard from 1967.

A three-speed manual gearbox with column change was standard on the HR with a two speed "Powerglide" automatic transmission available as an option. An Opel four-speed manual gearbox was offered from June 1967.

Production and replacement
A total of 252,352 vehicles were produced up to January 1968 when the HR was replaced by the Holden HK series.The price at release was A$2286 for the  Special Sedan manual and A$2856 for the Premier Station Sedan manual.

Body ID Plate Decoder 
HR Holden Australian Body Plate example

References

External links 
 A Brief History of the HR Holden at "The Sixties Holden Archives" Includes sales brochures
 Holden HR Technical Specifications at www.uniquecarsandparts.com.au

Cars introduced in 1966
Cars of Australia
HR
Cars discontinued in 1968